Pierre Lejeune Nlate (born 22 August 1988) is a Cameroon-French association footballer who plays as a defender.

Career
Signed by professional S.League club Etoile FC, for the 2011 S.League season, Pierre Lejeune Nlate made his debut in the 2-0 win over Geylang United on the opening day of the S.League season.

External links
 
 
 

1988 births
Living people
Cameroonian footballers
Cameroonian expatriate footballers
Association football defenders
French sportspeople of Cameroonian descent
French expatriate footballers
French footballers
Cameroon under-20 international footballers
AS Nancy Lorraine players
FC Gueugnon players
FC Villefranche Beaujolais players
Étoile FC players
Atlantis FC players
FC Myllypuro players
FC Viikingit players
Nurmijärven Jalkapalloseura players
French expatriate sportspeople in Singapore
French expatriate sportspeople in Finland
Cameroonian expatriate sportspeople in Singapore
Cameroonian expatriate sportspeople in Finland
Expatriate footballers in Singapore
Expatriate footballers in Finland